Fucha may refer to:

Antarctica
 Fucha Peak, named after the Bulgarian villages Mala and Gilema Fucha

Bulgaria
 Mala Fucha, village in Bobov Dol Municipality, Kyustendil Province
 Gilema Fucha, idem

Chile
 meaning "older man", in the Mapuche religion

China
 Fuchai or Fucha, King of Wu
 a village in Huamen, Shuangfeng, Hunan Province
 Fucha Township in Jiangxi Province
 Fucha Gui-ren a character in the television series Empresses in the Palace.
 Fucha Hengtai, main character in the Palace 3: The Lost Daughter television series

Colombia
 Fucha River, river of Bogotá
 Fucha (TransMilenio), TransMileno station named after the river

Japan
 Fucha Ryōri, vegetarian dish in the Japanese cuisine
 Imajinarī Fūchā, Japanese name of Da Capo II manga novel
 Fucha: The Other Side of the Melody, screenwritten by Hitomi Shiraishi

United States
 character in the Marielena telenovela